Below is a partial list of shows that were previously aired on the Philippine pay television network, Kapamilya Channel. For the currently aired shows of the network, see the list of programs broadcast by Kapamilya Channel.

Previous original programs

Newscast, current affairs, public service
 G Diaries 
 Gising Pilipinas! 
 Iba 'Yan! 
 KBYN: Kaagapay ng Bayan 
 Paano Kita Mapasasalamatan? 
 Radyo Patrol Balita Alas-Siyete 
 TeleBalita 

Re-runs
 Kuha Mo! 
 S.O.C.O.: Scene of the Crime Operatives

Drama
 2 Good 2 Be True 
 A Family Affair 
 A Soldier's Heart 
 Almost Paradise 
 Ang sa Iyo Ay Akin 
 FPJ's Ang Probinsyano 
 Bagong Umaga 
 Bawal Lumabas: The Series 
 Bola Bola 
 The Broken Marriage Vow 
 Click, Like, Share 
 Flower of Evil 
 He's Into Her 
 Hinahanap-Hanap Kita 
 Hoy, Love You! 
 Huwag Kang Mangamba 
 Init sa Magdamag 
 La Vida Lena 
 Love in 40 Days 
 Love Thy Woman 
 Lyric and Beat 
 Maalaala Mo Kaya 
 Marry Me, Marry You 
 Mars Ravelo's Darna 
 Run To Me 
 Unloving U 
 Walang Hanggang Paalam 
 Viral Scandal 

Re-runs
 Asintado 
 Bagani 
 Be My Lady 
 Dolce Amore 
 Hiwaga ng Kambat 
 Kadenang Ginto 
 Magpahanggang Wakas 
 Nang Ngumiti ang Langit 
 Parasite Island 
 The General's Daughter 
 The Good Son 
 Starla

Kids-oriented
 Pop Babies

Educational
 Epol/Apple 
 Sine'skwela

Reality
 Pinoy Big Brother: Balikbahay Edition 
 Pinoy Big Brother: Connect 
 Pinoy Big Brother: Kumunity Season 10 
 The Voice Teens (season 2) 
 Your Face Sounds Familiar (season 3)

Game
 Everybody, Sing! (season 1) 
 Everybody, Sing! (season 2) 
 I Can See Your Voice (season 1) 
 I Can See Your Voice (season 3) 
 I Can See Your Voice  (season 4)

Comedy
 Banana Sundae 
 Hoy, Love You! (season 1) 
 My Papa Pi (season 1)

Talk
 Lucky Tulong 
 Real Talk: The Heart of the Matter 
 We Rise Together

Informative
 Swak na Swak

Infomercial
 O Shopping

Previous acquired programs

Anime series
 The Adventures of Tom Sawyer 
 Charlotte 
 Legends of Dawn: The Sacred Stone

Cartoons
 The Adventures of Sonic the Hedgehog 
 The Garfield Show 
 Kongsuni and Friends 
 Masha and the Bear 
 Max Steel 
 Pororo the Little Penguin 
 Rob the Robot 
 Robocar Poli

Foreign drama
 100 Days My Prince 
 2gether: The Series 
 A Love So Beautiful 
 Because This Is My First Life 
 Black 
 Hana Nochi Hare 
 Code Name: Terrius 
 Come and Hug Me 
 Count Your Lucky Stars 
 Criminal Minds 
 Encounter 
 Ever Night: War of Brilliant Splendours 
 F4 Thailand: Boys Over Flowers 
 Familiar Wife 
 Flower Crew: Dating Agency 
 Gangnam Beauty 
 Go Back Couple 
 Goodbye Mr. Black 
 Hyde, Jekyll, Me 
 Hwayugi 
 I Have a Lover 
 I am Not a Robot 
 Love in Sadness 
 Melting Me Softly 
 Meow, The Secret Boy 
 Meteor Garden (2018 version) 
 Mother 
 Something in the Rain  
 Still 2gether 
 Story of Yanxi Palace 
 Suits 
 The King Is in Love 
 The World of a Married Couple 
 Two Cops 
 W 
 Weightlifting Fairy

Reality
 Dream Maker: Search For the Next Global Pop Group

Specials
 1MX One Music X in Manila 2021 
 ABS-CBN Christmas Specials 
 Ikaw ang Liwanag at Ligaya 
 Andito Tayo Para sa Isa't Isa 
 Tayo ang Ligaya ng Isa't Isa 
 Anim na Dekada... Nag-iisang Vilma 
 Binibining Pilipinas 2021 Coronation Night 
 Dua Lipa: Studio 2054 Concert 
 Miss Philippines Earth 2021 
 Miss Universe 2020 
 Miss Universe 2021 
 Miss Universe 2022 
 Mutya ng Pilipinas 2022 Coronation Night 
 Pinoy Big Brother: The Big Homecoming

See also
List of Philippine television shows
List of programs distributed by ABS-CBN
List of programs broadcast by ABS-CBN
List of programs broadcast by Kapamilya Online Live
List of programs broadcast by A2Z (Philippine TV channel)
List of programs broadcast by TV5 (Philippine TV network)
List of ABS-CBN specials aired

References

ABS-CBN
ABS-CBN Corporation
Lists of television series by network
Philippine television-related lists